The 1993 NAIA Division II football season, as part of the 1993 college football season in the United States and the 38th season of college football sponsored by the NAIA, was the 24th season of play of the NAIA's lower division for football.

The season was played from August to November 1993 and culminated in the 1993 NAIA Division II Football National Championship, played at Civic Stadium in Portland, Oregon.

Pacific Lutheran, led by College Football Hall of Fame head coach Frosty Westering, defeated Westminster (PA) in the championship game, 50–20, to win their third NAIA national title. All-American's Marc Weekly, Chad Barnett, Jeff Douglass and Gavin Stanley led the number one ranked offense in the country to a 50-point performance. Pacific Lutheran's offense averaged over 40 points per game in 1993. PLU's 'Big Play' defense was led by linebackers Ted Riddall, Jon Rubey and Judd Benedick while Albert Jackson and Jason Thiel head up the defensive line. Pacific Lutheran began the season ranked number one in the country and finished the season on top in historic style.

Conference standings

Conference champions

Postseason

‡ ''Game played at Puyallup, Washington

See also
 1993 NCAA Division I-A football season
 1993 NCAA Division I-AA football season
 1993 NCAA Division II football season
 1993 NCAA Division III football season

References

 
NAIA Football National Championship